Yael Emilio Pineda Ojeda (born 5 October 1992 in Cuernavaca, Morelos) is a Mexican professional footballer who plays for Tampico Madero F.C.

External links
 
 

Living people
1992 births
Association football forwards
Ballenas Galeana Morelos footballers
Alebrijes de Oaxaca players
Ascenso MX players
Sportspeople from Cuernavaca
Footballers from Morelos
Mexican footballers